Tavua F.C. (for Football Club) is a Fijian football team playing in the first division of the Fiji Football Association competitions. It is based in Tavua, which is situated on the western side of the main island of Viti Levu, between the town of Rakiraki and the town of Ba. Their home stadium is Garvey Park. Their uniform is gold shirt, black shorts and black socks.

History 
Tavua F.C. was founded in 1942, with the formation of Tavua Football Association, under the leadership of James Naidu.  The team languished in the second division has moved up to the first division, and has performed credibly in recent times. However in 2012 they relegated again, but they managed to come back for the 2018 season

Personnel

Current technical staff

Achievements
League Championship (for Districts): 0
Senior League (for Districts) - Second Tier: 1
Winner: 2017

Inter-District Championship: 1
Winner: 1995

Battle of the Giants: 0
Runner-up: 1996, 1999.

Fiji Football Association Cup Tournament: 1
Winner: 1994
Runner-up: 1993

See also 
 Fiji Football Association

References

Bibliography 
 M. Prasad, Sixty Years of Soccer in Fiji 1938–1998: The Official History of the Fiji Football Association, Fiji Football Association, Suva, 1998.

Football clubs in Fiji
1942 establishments in Fiji
Mining association football teams